Boehmeria calophleba  is a flowering plant in the nettle family.

Description
The tiny white flowers, clustered at the branch ends, appear from October to April; the stamens spring out to release pollen.

Distribution and habitat
The species is endemic to Australia’s subtropical Lord Howe Island in the Tasman Sea. Though generally uncommon, it is locally abundant in the moist forests of the southern parts of the Island, where it forms an association with Macropiper species on the north-western slopes of Mount Lidgbird.

References

External links

calophleba
Rosales of Australia
Endemic flora of Lord Howe Island
Plants described in 1872
Taxa named by Ferdinand von Mueller
Taxa named by Charles Moore